Dacrydium cupressinum, commonly known as rimu, is a large evergreen coniferous tree endemic to the forests of New Zealand. It is a member of the southern conifer group, the podocarps. 

The Māori name rimu comes from the Polynesian term limu which the tree's foliage were reminded of, ultimately from Proto-Austronesian *limut meaning "moss". The former name "red pine" has fallen out of common use.

Distribution
Rimu grows throughout New Zealand, in the North Island, South Island and Stewart Island/Rakiura. This species is common in lowland and montane forest. Although the largest concentration of trees is now found on the West Coast of the South Island, the biggest trees tend to be in mixed podocarp forest near Taupō (e.g., Pureora, Waihaha, and Whirinaki Forests). A typical North Island habitat is in the Hamilton Ecological District, where Fuscospora truncata and rimu form the overstory. Associate ferns on the forest floor are Blechnum discolor, Blechnum filiforme, Asplenium flaccidum and Hymenophyllum demissum. An 800-year-old rimu tree can be seen at the Otari-Wilton's Bush in Wellington.

Description
Rimu is a slow-growing tree, eventually attaining a height of up to 50 m, although most surviving large trees are 20 to 35 m tall. It typically appears as an emergent from mixed broadleaf temperate rainforest, although there are almost pure stands (especially on the west coast of the South Island). There are historical accounts of exceptionally tall trees, 61 m, from dense forest near National Park in the central North Island, now destroyed. Its lifespan is approximately 800 to 900 years. The straight trunk of the rimu is generally 1.5 m in diameter, but may be larger in old or very tall specimens.

The leaves are spirally arranged, awl-shaped, up to 7 mm long on juvenile plants, and 1 mm wide; and 2 to 3 mm long on mature trees. It is dioecious, with male and female cones on separate trees; the seeds take 15 months to mature after pollination. The mature cones comprise a swollen red fleshy scale six to ten mm long bearing one (rarely two) apical seeds 4 mm long. The seeds are dispersed by birds which eat the fleshy scale and pass the seed on in their droppings; the cones are an important food resource for some species, particularly the kakapo, whose breeding cycle has been linked to the fruiting cycle of the tree.

Uses
Māori originally used the resinous heartwood of rimu (called māpara or kāpara) for wooden items such as heru (combs) and fernroot beaters. Historically, rimu and other native trees such as kauri, matai and totara were the main sources of wood for New Zealand, including furniture and house construction. However, many of New Zealand's original stands of rimu have been destroyed, and recent government policies forbid the felling of rimu in public forests, though allowing limited logging on private land. Pinus radiata has now replaced rimu in most industries, although rimu remains popular for the production of high quality wooden furniture. There is also limited recovery of stump and root wood, from trees felled many years before, for use in making bowls and other wood turned objects.

The inner bark can also be used to treat burns and cuts.

In cultivation 
Although slow to establish, with a long juvenile period and fairly high moisture requirements, rimu is widely grown as an ornamental tree in New Zealand. It is attractive at all growth stages, usually quite narrow when young, then developing into a broader tree with weeping branches before finally progressing to its more upright adult form. While rimu does exhibit some variation in the wild, garden cultivars are largely unknown, except for one recent introduction, 'Charisma', which is a compact, golden-foliaged form.

References

External links
 

cupressinum
Trees of New Zealand
Trees of mild maritime climate
Least concern plants
Plants used in traditional Māori medicine